Cheap may refer to:
Cheapness
Cheap (album), debut album from Seasick Steve
Cheap (ward), London, UK
Flatwoods, Kentucky, previously known as Cheap

See also
Cheapskate
Cheep (disambiguation)